Joseph Abbott may refer to:
Joseph Abbott (Canadian priest) (1790–1862), Canadian, father of John Joseph Caldwell Abbott (3rd Prime Minister of Canada)
Joseph Abbott (Irish priest) (died 1939), Dean of Leighlin
Joseph Abbott (New South Wales politician) (1843–1903), member for Newtown and Newtown-Camperdown
Joseph Abbott (Texas politician) (1840–1908), American politician,  Democrat in the United States House of Representatives
Joseph Carter Abbott (1825–1881), U.S. Army general and U.S. Senator
Joseph Florence Abbott (1888–1961), American lawyer
Joseph Palmer Abbott (1842–1901), Australian politician and solicitor, member for Gunnedah and Wentworth
Joe Abbott (Australian politician) (1891–1965), son of Joseph Palmer Abbott, member for New England and Minister for Home Security
Joe Abbott (speedway rider) (1902–1950), British motorcyclist